Sharperton is a small settlement and former civil parish, now in the parish of Harbottle, in Northumberland, England. Sharperton is the site of a deserted medieval village, which was documented as having 14 taxpayers in 1296, and described as having two short rows of dwellings in 1632. There was also a bastle (fortified farmhouse) here. In 1951 the parish had a population of 36.

Governance 
Sharperton is in the parliamentary constituency of Berwick-upon-Tweed. Sharperton was formerly a township in Alwinton parish, from 1866 Sharperton was a civil parish in its own right until it was abolished on 1 April 1955 and merged with Harbottle.

References

External links

Villages in Northumberland
Former civil parishes in Northumberland